Shafaqna (Persian: شفقنا; International Shia News Association or Shia News Agency) is one of the main international Shia news-gathering organisations. It focuses on news relating to Shia Islam. It started its activities on Friday, February 24, 2012. It is an independent medium implemented in ten languages: English, French, Spanish, Persian, Arabic, Turkish, Urdu, Azerbaijani and Russian. Material in Arabic is produced out of Najaf, Persian from Tehran, Turkish from Istanbul, and English from UK. Shafaqna has also launched several independent pages: Pakistan, India, Lebanon, India, Iraq and Afghanistan.

Shafaqna explained its editorial intent to extend its coverage to all Islamic and specifically Shia events and activities across the world. It would inaugurate  dialogues between Shia Islam and other faiths and religions in a peacebuilding manner.

Shafaqna is recognised as a news organisation close to the Ayatollah Ali al-Sistani, the highest ranking Shia jurist in Iraq, and has published several articles about his doctrine that may be considered his legacy. Shafaqna also publishes Sistani fatwas frequently. Much of Shafaqna's progress is credited to its access to the Najaf seminary, publishing rare interviews with high ranking clerics, photographs of the tomb of the prophet Muhammad and his daughter's (Fatemeh) house, and exclusive news of the top Maraji of Najaf Hawzah Grand Ayatollah Ali al-Sistani.

In June 2014, Shafaqna launched a chain of news readers called Lnews (Latest World News by Country - Independent World News Platform). Its English version is called Enews (Internation News Agencies headlines). Shafaqna Multilingual News Reader originated as an Internet-based news aggregator, so the text which appears on the chain of websites is made up of a list of items and contents presented in RSS feeds offered by news gathering organisations and websites across the world using automatic input devices. It operates in different languages, mainly English, Arabic, Persian, Spanish, French, Urdu, Dutch, and Chinese. This news reader categorized news into "Last News", "Featured", "Most popular".

As presented on its front page, the chain of news readers operated by Shafaqna cover more than 100 countries. Its news and articles originally come from a range of global, regional and national news agencies, newspapers, and local web based news media from AP, AFP, EFE, and Reuters to CNN, BBC, CCTV, Kyodo, Xinhua, PRESS TV, IRIB, SPA and Itar-Tass.

References

External links
Official website

Shia media
Religious mass media
News agencies based in Iraq
News agencies based in Iran
News agencies based in Turkey
News agencies based in India
News agencies based in Afghanistan
News agencies based in Lebanon
News agencies based in Pakistan
News agencies based in the United Kingdom